Liverpool Scotland was a constituency represented in the House of Commons of the Parliament of the United Kingdom. It elected one Member of Parliament (MP) by the first past the post system of election.

It was located within the city of Liverpool in England, centred on Scotland Road. The constituency was notable as the only parliamentary constituency in Great Britain to elect an Irish nationalist Member of Parliament. Between 1885 and 1964, a span of seventy-nine years, the constituency was represented by only two MPs.

The constituency was created under the Redistribution of Seats Act 1885, when the former Liverpool constituency was split into nine divisions. It was abolished for the February 1974 general election, when it was merged with Liverpool Exchange to form the Liverpool Scotland Exchange constituency.

Members of Parliament

Liverpool Scotland was characterized by having two MPs of exceptionally long service. T.P. O'Connor served in the constituency for 44 years until his death in 1929, becoming Father of the House in 1918. It was the only constituency outside the island of Ireland ever to return an Irish Nationalist Party MP, and O'Connor continued to be re-elected in Liverpool under this label unopposed, despite the Irish Free State achieving Dominion status in 1922. He was succeeded by the winner of the by-election, David Logan, who served for a further 35 years until his own death in 1964. He was never Father of the House, but he was its oldest sitting member from 1950 until his death.

Boundaries 
1885–1918: The Municipal Borough of Liverpool ward of Scotland.

1918–1950: The County Borough of Liverpool wards of North Scotland, Sandhills, and South Scotland, and part of Vauxhall ward.

1950–1955: The County Borough of Liverpool wards of Everton, Netherfield, North Scotland, St Domingo, Sandhills, and South Scotland.

1955–1974: The County Borough of Liverpool wards of Everton, Netherfield, St Domingo, Sandhills, and Vauxhall.

Election results

Elections in the 1880s

Elections in the 1890s

Elections in the 1900s

Elections in the 1910s

Elections in the 1920s

Elections in the 1930s

Elections in the 1940s

Elections in the 1950s

Elections in the 1960s

Elections in the 1970s

References

Sources
Election results, 1950 - 1970
F. W. S. Craig, British Parliamentary Election Results 1918 - 1949
F. W. S. Craig, British Parliamentary Election Results 1885 - 1918

See also
Liverpool Riverside

Scotland
Parliamentary constituencies in North West England (historic)
Constituencies of the Parliament of the United Kingdom established in 1885
Constituencies of the Parliament of the United Kingdom disestablished in 1974